Poland competed at the 1986 European Athletics Championships in Stuttgart, West Germany, from 26 to 31 August 1986. A delegation of 34 athletes were sent to represent the country.

Medals

References

European Athletics Championships
1986
Nations at the 1986 European Athletics Championships